Will Taylor may refer to:

 Will Taylor (land speculator) (1853–1941), land speculator and founder of North Bend, Washington
 J. Will Taylor (1880–1939), U.S. Representative from Tennessee
 Will Taylor (Derbyshire cricketer) (1885–1976), Derbyshire cricketer and secretary of the club for 51 years
 Will Taylor (footballer) (1911–1999), Australian rules footballer
 Will Taylor (musician) (born 1968), musician from Austin, Texas
 Will Taylor (rugby union) (born 1991), Welsh rugby union player
 Will Taylor (music producer) (born 1991), music producer and songwriter from Leicester, UK
 Will Taylor (American football) (born 2003), American football player
 Will Taylor (Emmerdale), a fictional character in British soap opera Emmerdale

See also  
 William Taylor (disambiguation)